The Men's League for Women's Suffrage may refer to:

The Men's League, United States women's suffrage group, also known as the Men's Equal Suffrage League and the Men's League for Women's Suffrage
The Men's League for Women's Suffrage (United Kingdom), United Kingdom women's suffrage group

Voter rights and suffrage organizations